Éléonore Caroit (born 8 July 1985) is a French politician from Renaissance who has represented the Second constituency for French residents overseas in the National Assembly since 2022.

See also 

 List of deputies of the 16th National Assembly of France

References 

Living people
1985 births
Deputies of the 16th National Assembly of the French Fifth Republic
21st-century French politicians
21st-century French women politicians
Women members of the National Assembly (France)
La République En Marche! politicians
Members of Parliament for French people living outside France